Kungsgatan is a 1943 Swedish drama film directed by Gösta Cederlund.

Cast
 Barbro Kollberg as Marta
 Sture Lagerwall as Adrian
 Marianne Löfgren as Dolly, prostitute
 Lisskulla Jobs as Cecilia, prostitute
 Barbro Flodquist as Viran, prostitute
 Stina Ståhle as Karossen, prostitute
 Viveka Linder as Lisa Ek, prostitute
 Naima Wifstrand as Caretaker's Wife
 Linnéa Hillberg as Marta's Mother
 Gösta Cederlund as Doctor

References

External links
 

1943 films
1943 drama films
Swedish drama films
Swedish black-and-white films
1940s Swedish-language films
1940s Swedish films